The 1978 season was Molde's fifth consecutive year in the top flight, and their 7th season in total in the top flight of Norwegian football. This season Molde competed in 1. divisjon (first tier), the Norwegian Cup and the 1978–79 UEFA Cup.

In the league, Molde finished in 10th position, 21 points behind winners Start and were relegated to the 2. divisjon. Molde entered the first round of the 1978–79 UEFA Cup. On 27 September, they were eliminated by Torpedo Moscow with a 3–7 loss on aggregate.

Season events

Squad
Source:

Friendlies

Competitions

1. divisjon

Results summary 

Source:

Table

Norwegian Cup

UEFA Cup

Squad statistics

Appearances and goals
Lacking information:
Appearance statistics from 1. divisjon round 4 (away against Start), round 11 (at home against Moss), round 20 (at home against Vålerengen) and one goalscorer from round 4 (away against Start) are missing.
Appearance statistics from Norwegian Cup round 2 (against Brekken) and round 3 (against Tornado) are missing.

|}

Goalscorers

See also
Molde FK seasons

References

1978
Molde